The 2004–05 season was the 69th season in the existence of CD Numancia and the club's first season back in the top flight of Spanish football. In addition to the domestic league, Numancia participated in this season's edition of the Copa del Rey. The season covered the period from 1 July 2004 to 30 June 2005.

Competitions

Overview

La Liga

League table

Results summary

Results by round

Matches

Source:

Copa del Rey

References

CD Numancia seasons
Numancia